Ministry of Healthcare may refer to:

 Ministry of Healthcare (Azerbaijan)
 Ministry of Healthcare (Kazakhstan)
 Ministry of Healthcare (Ukraine)